Shradha Pandit (born 4 July 1982) is an Indian playback singer.

Career
Shradha grew up in Mumbai and belongs to a large family of successful musicians, singers, music producers and actors. She learnt Hindustani Classical Music from her Grandfather, Sangeet Acharya Late Shri. Pandit Pratap Narayan. Shradha has sung for many prolific music composers including A. R. Rahman, Amit Trivedi, Salim–Sulaiman, Badshah and many more. Her all-time hits are "Pehli Pehli Baar Baliye", "Ae Shivani", "Rang Deeni", "Sasural Genda Phool", "Jigar Da Tukda", "Manchandre Nu", "Khuda Ke Liye", "Bipasha", "Aiyoji", "Rab Rakha" and "Band Baaja Baaraat". Her latest chartbusters are "Pani Wala Dance" (2015) and "Aaj Raat Ka Scene" (2016). Shradha has also released an album, Teri Heer from Sony Music in 2008, where she wrote lyrics and composed all the songs by herself. Her two siblings have successful careers in the Bollywood industry where her sister, Shweta Pandit is also a well-known playback singer and her brother Yash Pandit is a film and television star. Shradha's entry in the Bollywood music industry was with the song "Mausam Ke Sargam" from the film Khamoshi the musical as a child artist, which got her instant fame in the year 1998 and her successful journey continues till date.

Filmography as Playback Singer
Khamoshi: The Musical (1996)
Sangharsh (1999)
Khoobsurat (1999)
Raju Chacha (2000)
Jis Desh Mein Ganga Rehta Hain (2000)
Shararat (2002 film) (2002)
Kehtaa Hai Dil Baar Baar (2002)
Dev (2004)
Deewaar (2004)
Fareb (2005)
Black & White (2008)
Delhi-6 (2009)
Band Baaja Baaraat (2010)
Love Breakups Zindagi (2011)
Aazaan (2011)
Ladies vs Ricky Bahl (2011)
Jodi Breakers (2012)
Denikaina Ready (2012)
Heroine – "Tujh Pe Fida"
Satyagraha – Democracy Under Fire (2013)
Love Exchange (film)
Action Jackson (2014) - "AJ Theme"
Kuch Kuch Locha Hai – "Pani Wala Dance" (2015)
Jazbaa — "Aaj Raat Ka Scene" Ft. Badshah (2015)
Bareilly Ki Barfi - "Sweety Tera Drama" (with Dev Negi, Pawni Pandey) (2017)

References

External links

Living people
Bollywood playback singers
Indian women pop singers
Indian women playback singers
1982 births
21st-century Indian singers
21st-century Indian women singers
Women musicians from Maharashtra
Singers from Mumbai